Rudiviridae is a family of viruses with linear double stranded DNA genomes that infect archaea. The viruses of this family are highly thermostable and can act as a template for site-selective and spatially controlled chemical modification. Furthermore, the two strands of the DNA are covalently linked at both ends of the genomes, which have long inverted terminal repeats. These inverted repeats are an adaptation to stabilize the genome in these extreme environments.

Taxonomy
The following genera are assigned to the family:
 Azorudivirus
 Hoswirudivirus
 Icerudivirus
 Itarudivirus
 Japarudivirus
 Mexirudivirus
 Usarudivirus

References 

Virus families